Ryan Lauer is an American politician serving as a member of the Indiana House of Representatives from the 59th district. He assumed office on November 7, 2018.

Early life and education 
Lauer is a native of Columbus, Indiana. He earned a Bachelor of Science degree in mathematics and biochemistry from Indiana University Bloomington.

Career 
Lauer began his career as a technical support employee for Kiva Networking and BlueMarble Telecom. He was a violinist in the Columbus Indiana Philharmonic and founded Lauer Technology in 2004. He has also worked as a technical specialist for Cummins. Lauer was elected to the Indiana House of Representatives in November 2018. He also serves as vice chair of the Veterans Affairs and Public Safety Committee.

In December 2021, Lauer co-authored House Bill 1001, which would "end the statewide public health emergency and to restrict business options to require COVID-19 vaccinations".

References 

Living people
Republican Party members of the Indiana House of Representatives
Indiana University Bloomington alumni
People from Columbus, Indiana
Year of birth missing (living people)